The Gill was an English car based on the Astra and built in George Street, Paddington, London from 1958 to 1960 by a subsidiary of the British Anzani Company. It was another product of the fuel shortages that occurred during the 1956 Suez Crisis.

Like the Astra it featured a rear-mounted 322 cc air-cooled engine mounted under the floor at the rear and all-round independent suspension with swing axles at the rear. Drive was by chain to the rear wheels through a three-speed motorcycle gearbox with floor-mounted change lever. The brakes were hydraulically operated.

The two seat body was made from aluminium over a wood frame mounted on a steel chassis. It shared the Astra's front bodywork  but from the windscreen back it was bodied as a coupé called the Getabout. A four-seat taxi version was also proposed and some saloons might have been made. At £500 (£523 for the de-luxe) the car was expensive when a Ford Popular cost £444.

See also
 List of car manufacturers of the United Kingdom

References 

Microcars
Defunct motor vehicle manufacturers of England
Vehicle manufacture in London
Cars introduced in 1958